John Arthur Moyer (February 25, 1922 – August 27, 2014) was an American physician and politician in the State of Washington. Moyer served in the Washington House of Representatives from 1987 to 1993 and the Washington State Senate from 1993 to 1997.

Citations

Republican Party members of the Washington House of Representatives
Republican Party Washington (state) state senators
1922 births
2014 deaths